Black Roots is a 1979 album by Sugar Minott. It was the first to appear on Minott's Black Roots label, and was described in the book Reggae: 100 Essential CDs – The Rough Guide as a "classic, which catches the singer on the cusp of the roots and dancehall phases, and with total control over his music." The album includes contributions from some of Jamaica's top session musicians including Leroy "Horsemouth" Wallace, Noel "Scully" Simms, Eric "Bingy Bunny" Lamont, Gladstone Anderson, Larry 'Professor Bassie' Silvera and Ansell Collins, with harmony vocals provided by Don Carlos, Lacksley Castell and Ashanti Waugh. Two of the tracks on the album had previously been issued as singles – "Hard Time Pressure" and "River Jordan". The album was described by Dave Thompson in his book Reggae & Caribbean Music as a "deeply dread collection...time has bestowed a stately uniqueness to it". Alex Henderson, writing for AllMusic, said of the album: "If you combined Stax's raw production style with the type of sweetness that characterized a lot of Chicago, Detroit and Philadelphia soul and added a reggae beat, the outcome might sound something like Black Roots."

Release history
The album was first issued in limited quantities in Jamaica on Minott's Black Roots label in 1979. It was issued in the United Kingdom on the Island Records subsidiary, Mango, in 1980, and also on the Gorgon label. It was issued on compact disc in 1990 by Mango Records.

Track listing
All tracks by Sugar Minott except where noted.

"Mankind" – 2:17
"Hard Time Pressure" – 3:24
"River Jordan" – 3:10
"Jail House" – 2:15
"I'm Gonna Hold On" – 2:38
"Oppressors Oppression" – 3:49
"2 Time Loser" – 3:07
"Black Roots" – 2:31
"Clean Runnings" – 3:02
"Mr. Babylon Man" (Minott, Morris) – 2:48

Personnel
Sugar Minott – vocals, production
Noel Bailey – guitar
Eric "Bingy Bunny" Lamont – guitar
Tony Chin – guitar
Gladstone Anderson – piano
Ansell Collins – organ
Steely Johnson – organ
Eric "Fish" Clarke – drums
Junior Dan – bass guitar, rhythm guitar
Michael "Ras Star" Ashley – bass guitar, rhythm guitar
Albert Malawi – drums
Noel "Scully" Simms – percussion
Everton "Youth" Carrington – percussion
Leroy "Horsemouth" Wallace – drums
Don Carlos – backing vocals
Lacksley Castell – backing vocals
Glenmore "Ashanti" Waugh – backing vocals
Johnny "Jah" Lee – backing vocals
Mixed by Prince Jammy and Stanley "Barnabas" Bryan
Engineered by Anthony "Crucial Bunny" Graham & Stanley "Barnabas" Bryan

References

1979 albums
Sugar Minott albums
Mango Records albums